Trading up the chain is a marketing and propaganda tactic of deliberately inducing circular reporting, by seeding a message or claim in a less-credible medium, with the intent of it being quoted and repeated by publications (or people) who appeal to a wider audience. Those more-authoritative sources are then cited, to build up the message's credibility and publicize it further. Trading up the chain can be a tactic for disinformation and media manipulation.

The term was publicized by the author and marketer Ryan Holiday, who described its use in marketing and politics.

See also 
 Information laundering
 Argument from authority
 Disinformation
 Astroturfing

References

Disinformation
Internet manipulation and propaganda
Marketing strategy
News media manipulation
Publicity